The FFM Award for Best Actor is one of the Malaysia Film Festival Awards given to people working in the motion picture industry by the National Film Development Council of Malaysia, which are voted on by award-winning writers, filmmakers and movie columnists and writers within the industry.

Winners and nominees
The list may be incomplete such as some of the names of the nominees and the roles portrayed especially during the early years of FFM Awards.

In the lists below, the winner of the award for each year is shown first, followed by the other nominees.

1980s

1990s

2000s

2010s

Note:
 (†)  indicates the winner of the Asia Pacific Film Festival
 (‡)  indicates the nomination of the Asia Pacific Film Festival

List of Best Actor winners by age

Note:
 Place of born does not represent the nationality since all nominees and winners must be a Malaysian citizen.
 Age count is upon winning and not upon filming.

References

Malaysian film awards
Film awards for lead actor
Awards for male actors
Lists of films by award